Post-empiricism is the abandonment of strict empirical methods by modern empiricists.

See also
Positivism
Post-positivism

References

Positivism
Empiricism